Edward George Boyle (born Edward Joshua Boyle, 30 January 1899 – 17 February 1977) was a Canadian set decorator and director active in Hollywood between 1925 and 1970.

Career
Boyle's career began in the early 1930s, when he started working on the first of over 100 films. His  filmography includes such credits as an uncredited assist on the wartorn old South in Victor Fleming's classic Gone with the Wind (1939), the Nazi-influenced designs for Charlie Chaplin's fictional country of Tomania in The Great Dictator (1940), the gritty boxing world in Robert Rossen's Body and Soul (1947) and Mark Robson's Champion (1949), an elegant Bournemouth seaside hotel in Separate Tables (1958), island life at the turn of the century in George Roy Hill's Hawaii (1966) and the sophisticated demi-monde of the multi-millionaire lifestyles in Norman Jewison's The Thomas Crown Affair (1968).

Winner of the Academy Award in 1960 for Billy Wilder's The Apartment, Boyle was nominated six other times: for The Son of Monte Cristo in 1940, Some Like It Hot in 1959, The Children's Hour in 1961, Seven Days in May in 1964, The Fortune Cookie in 1966 and Gaily Gaily in 1969.

References

External links

Further reading

Articles
 "Boyle Heads Decorators". The Hollywood Reporter. May 17, 1943. p. 3.

Books
 Hanson, Patricia King; Gevinson, Alan (1993). American Film Institute Catalog; Feature Films, 1931–1940. Berkeley, CA: University of California Press. p. 92. .

1880s births
Canadian military personnel from Ontario
Year of death missing
Best Art Direction Academy Award winners
Canadian Expeditionary Force officers
Princess Patricia's Canadian Light Infantry officers
Set decorators